Chrystelle-Arlette Sahuc, better known as Chrystelle Sahuc, (born February 9, 1975, Alès, Gard, France) is a retired French rhythmic gymnast.

She competed for France in the individual rhythmic gymnastics all-around competition at the 1992 Olympic Games in Barcelona. She was 19th in the qualification round and didn't advance to the final.

References

External links 
 Chrystelle-Arlette Sahuc at Sports-Reference.com

1975 births
Living people
French rhythmic gymnasts
Gymnasts at the 1992 Summer Olympics
Olympic gymnasts of France
People from Alès
Sportspeople from Gard